The Site of Joining Forces in Wenjiashi of Autumn Harvest Uprising is located in Wenjiashi Town, approximately 51km from Liuyang city, Hunan, China. It contains buildings such as Liren School and the Memorial Museum. It is one of the most popular tourist attractions in Liuyang, Hunan province.

History
Liren School was originally built in 1841, in the region of Daoguang Emperor of the Qing dynasty (1644–1911).

It was officially renamed "Liren School" in 1912.

On September 9, 1927, the Communist leader Mao Zedong launched the Autumn Harvest Uprising in Hunan-Jiangxi border region.  A few days later while he and his army was defeated by the Kuomintang army, they assembled in Wenjiashi, Liuyang of Hunan province. On September 19, 1927, Mao hosted a military conference in here at night, then he and his army marched to Jinggang Mountains and gave up the plan of attacking Changsha.

On 4 March 1961, it was listed as a Major Historical and Cultural Site Protected at the National Level in Hunan province by the State Council of the People's Republic of China.

In 1977, the Liuyang government built a memorial museum in here, it has an area of about 12474 square meters, the museum holds many historical relics.

References

Bibliography

External links
 

Buildings and structures in Changsha
Major National Historical and Cultural Sites in Hunan
Conflicts in 1927
Military operations of the Chinese Civil War
Military history of Hunan